Pandora is an inner satellite of Saturn. It was discovered in 1980 from photos taken by the Voyager 1 probe, and was provisionally designated . In late 1985 it was officially named after Pandora from Greek mythology. It is also designated .

Pandora was thought to be an outer shepherd satellite of the F Ring. However, recent studies indicate that it does not play such a role, and that only Prometheus, the inner shepherd, contributes to the confinement of the narrow ring. It is more heavily cratered than nearby Prometheus, and has at least two large craters  in diameter. The majority of craters on Pandora are shallow as a result of being filled with debris. Ridges and grooves are also present on moon's surface.

The orbit of Pandora appears to be chaotic, as a consequence of a series of four 118:121 mean-motion resonances with Prometheus. Pandora also has a 3:2 mean-motion resonance with Mimas.

From its very low density and relatively high albedo, it seems likely that Pandora is a very porous icy body. There is much uncertainty in these values, however, so this remains to be confirmed.

Gallery

References 

Notes

Citations

Sources

External links 

 Pandora at NASA's Solar System Exploration
 Pandora at The Planetary Society

Moons of Saturn
Astronomical objects discovered in 1980
Discoveries by Stewart A. Collins
Moons with a prograde orbit